A match is a tool for starting a fire. Typically, matches are made of small wooden sticks or stiff paper. One end is coated with a material that can be ignited by friction generated by striking the match against a suitable surface. Wooden matches are packaged in matchboxes, and paper matches are partially cut into rows and stapled into matchbooks. The coated end of a match, known as the match "head", consists of a bead of active ingredients and binder, often colored for easier inspection. There are two main types of matches: safety matches, which can be struck only against a specially prepared surface, and strike-anywhere matches, for which any suitably frictional surface can be used. Because of the substance used to coat each match, this makes them non-biodegradable.

Etymology

Historically, the term match referred to lengths of cord (later cambric) impregnated with chemicals, and allowed to burn continuously. These were used to light fires and fire guns (see matchlock) and cannons (see linstock). Such matches were characterised by their burning speed i.e. quick match and slow match.

The modern equivalent of this sort of match is the simple fuse, still used in pyrotechnics to obtain a controlled time delay before ignition. The original meaning of the word still persists in some pyrotechnics terms, such as black match (a black-powder-impregnated fuse) and Bengal match (a firework akin to sparklers producing a relatively long-burning, colored flame). But, when friction matches became commonplace, they became the main object meant by the term.

The word ‘match’ derives from Old French ‘mèche’, referring to the wick of a candle.

History

Early matches

A note in the text Cho Keng Lu, written in 1366, describes a sulfur match, small sticks of pinewood impregnated with sulfur, used in China by "impoverished court ladies" in AD 577 during the conquest of Northern Qi. During the Five Dynasties and Ten Kingdoms (AD 907–960), a book called the Records of the Unworldly and the Strange written by Chinese author Tao Gu in about 950 stated:
If there occurs an emergency at night it may take some time to make a light to light a lamp. But an ingenious man devised the system of impregnating little sticks of pinewood with sulfur and storing them ready for use. At the slightest touch of fire, they burst into flame. One gets a little flame like an ear of corn. This marvelous thing was formerly called a "light-bringing slave", but afterward when it became an article of commerce its name was changed to 'fire inch-stick'.
Another text, Wu Lin Chiu Shih, dated from 1270 AD, lists sulfur matches as something that was sold in the markets of Hangzhou, around the time of Marco Polo's visit. The matches were known as fa chu or tshui erh.

Chemical matches

Before the use of matches, fires were sometimes lit using a burning glass (a lens) to focus the sun on tinder, a method that could only work on sunny days. Another more common method was igniting tinder with sparks produced by striking flint and steel, or by sharply increasing air pressure in a fire piston. Early work had been done by alchemist Hennig Brand, who discovered the flammable nature of phosphorus in 1669. Others, including Robert Boyle and his assistant, Ambrose Godfrey, continued these experiments in the 1680s with phosphorus and sulfur, but their efforts did not produce practical and inexpensive methods for generating fires.

A number of different ways were employed in order to light smoking tobacco: One was the use of a spill – a thin object something like a thin candle, a rolled paper or a straw, which would be lit from a nearby, already existing flame and then used to light the cigar or pipe – most often kept near the fireplace in a spill vase. Another method saw the use of a striker, a tool that looked like scissors, but with flint on one "blade" and steel on the other. These would then be rubbed together, ultimately producing sparks. If neither of these two was available, one could also use ember tongs to pick up a coal from a fire and light the tobacco directly.

The first modern, self-igniting match was invented in 1805 by Jean Chancel, assistant to Professor Louis Jacques Thénard of Paris. The head of the match consisted of a mixture of potassium chlorate, sulfur, gum arabic and sugar. The match was ignited by dipping its tip in a small asbestos bottle filled with sulfuric acid. This kind of match was quite expensive, however, and its use was also relatively dangerous, so Chancel's matches never really became widely adopted or in commonplace use.

This approach to match making was further refined in the following decades, culminating with the 'Promethean match' that was patented by Samuel Jones of London in 1828. His match consisted of a small glass capsule containing a chemical composition of sulfuric acid colored with indigo and coated on the exterior with potassium chlorate, all of which was wrapped up in rolls of paper. The immediate ignition of this particular form of a match was achieved by crushing the capsule with a pair of pliers, mixing and releasing the ingredients in order for it to become alight.

In London, similar matches meant for lighting cigars were introduced in 1849 by Heurtner who had a shop called the Lighthouse in the Strand. One version that he sold was called "Euperion" (sometimes "Empyrion") which was popular for kitchen use and nicknamed as "Hugh Perry", while another meant for outdoor use was called a "Vesuvian" or "flamer". The head was large and contained niter, charcoal and wood dust, and had a phosphorus tip. The handle was large and made of hardwood so as to burn vigorously and last for a while. Some even had glass stems. Both Vesuvians and Prometheans had a bulb of sulfuric acid at the tip which had to be broken to start the reaction.

Samuel Jones introduced fuzees for lighting cigars and pipes in 1832. A similar invention was patented in 1839 by John Hucks Stevens in America.

In 1832, William Newton patented the "wax vesta" in England. It consisted of a wax stem that embedded cotton threads and had a tip of phosphorus. Variants known as "candle matches" were made by Savaresse and Merckel in 1836. John Hucks Stevens also patented a safety version of the friction match in 1839.

Friction matches

Chemical matches were unable to make the leap into mass production, due to the expense, their cumbersome nature and inherent danger. An alternative method was to produce the ignition through friction produced by rubbing two rough surfaces together. An early example was made by François Derosne in 1816. His crude match was called a briquet phosphorique and it used a sulfur-tipped match to scrape inside a tube coated internally with phosphorus. It was both inconvenient and unsafe.

The first successful friction match was invented in 1826 by John Walker, an English chemist and druggist from Stockton-on-Tees, County Durham. He developed a keen interest in trying to find a means of obtaining fire easily. Several chemical mixtures were already known which would ignite by a sudden explosion, but it had not been found possible to transmit the flame to a slow-burning substance like wood. While Walker was preparing a lighting mixture on one occasion, a match which had been dipped in it took fire by an accidental friction upon the hearth. He at once appreciated the practical value of the discovery, and started making friction matches. They consisted of wooden splints or sticks of cardboard coated with sulfur and tipped with a mixture of sulfide of antimony, chlorate of potash, and gum. The treatment with sulfur helped the splints to catch fire, and the odor was improved by the addition of camphor. The price of a box of 50 matches was one shilling. With each box was supplied a piece of sandpaper, folded double, through which the match had to be drawn to ignite it. Walker did not name the matches "Congreves" in honour of the inventor and rocket pioneer Sir William Congreve, as it is sometimes stated. The congreves were the invention of Charles Sauria, a French chemistry student at the time.  Walker did not divulge the exact composition of his matches. Between 1827 and 1829, Walker made about 168 sales of his matches. It was however dangerous and flaming balls sometimes fell to the floor burning carpets and dresses, leading to their ban in France and Germany. Walker either refused or neglected to patent his invention.

In 1829, Scots inventor Sir Isaac Holden invented an improved version of Walker's match and demonstrated it to his class at Castle Academy in Reading, Berkshire. Holden did not patent his invention and claimed that one of his pupils wrote to his father Samuel Jones, a chemist in London who commercialised his process. A version of Holden's match was patented by Samuel Jones, and these were sold as lucifer matches. These early matches had a number of problems an initial violent reaction, an unsteady flame, and unpleasant odor and fumes. Lucifers could ignite explosively, sometimes throwing sparks a considerable distance. Lucifers were manufactured in the United States by Ezekial Byam. The term "lucifer" persisted as slang in the 20th century (for example in the First World War song Pack Up Your Troubles) and matches are still called lucifers in Dutch.

Lucifers were quickly replaced after 1830 by matches made according to the process devised by Frenchman Charles Sauria, who substituted white phosphorus for the antimony sulfide. These new phosphorus matches had to be kept in airtight metal boxes but became popular and went by the name of loco foco in the United States, from which was derived the name of a political party. The earliest American patent for the phosphorus friction match was granted in 1836 to Alonzo Dwight Phillips of Springfield, Massachusetts.

From 1830 to 1890, the composition of these matches remained largely unchanged, although some improvements were made. In 1843 William Ashgard replaced the sulfur with beeswax, reducing the pungency of the fumes. This was replaced by paraffin in 1862 by Charles W. Smith, resulting in what were called "parlor matches". From 1870 the end of the splint was fireproofed by impregnation with fire-retardant chemicals such as alum, sodium silicate, and other salts resulting in what was commonly called a "drunkard's match" that prevented the accidental burning of the user's fingers. Other advances were made for the mass manufacture of matches. Early matches were made from blocks of woods with cuts separating the splints but leaving their bases attached. Later versions were made in the form of thin combs. The splints would be broken away from the comb when required.

A noiseless match was invented in 1836 by the Hungarian János Irinyi, who was a student of chemistry. An unsuccessful experiment by his professor, Meissner, gave Irinyi the idea to replace potassium chlorate with lead dioxide in the head of the phosphorus match. He liquefied phosphorus in warm water and shook it in a glass vial, until the two liquids emulsified. He mixed the phosphorus with lead dioxide and gum arabic, poured the paste-like mass into a jar, and dipped the pine sticks into the mixture and let them dry. When he tried them that evening, all of them lit evenly. He sold the invention and production rights for these noiseless matches to István Rómer, a Hungarian pharmacist living in Vienna, for 60 florins (about 22.5 oz t of silver). As a match manufacturer, Rómer became rich, and Irinyi went on to publish articles and a textbook on chemistry, and founded several match factories.

Replacement of white phosphorus

Those involved in the manufacture of the new phosphorus matches were afflicted with phossy jaw and other bone disorders, and there was enough white phosphorus in one pack to kill a person. Deaths and suicides from eating the heads of matches became frequent. The earliest report of phosphorus necrosis was made in 1845 by Lorinser in Vienna, and a New York surgeon published a pamphlet with notes on nine cases.

The conditions of working-class women at the Bryant & May factories led to the London matchgirls strike of 1888. The strike was focused on the severe health complications of working with white phosphorus, such as phossy jaw. Social activist Annie Besant published an article in her halfpenny weekly paper The Link on 23 June 1888. A strike fund was set up and some newspapers collected donations from readers. The women and girls also solicited contributions. Members of the Fabian Society, including George Bernard Shaw, Sidney Webb, and Graham Wallas, were involved in the distribution of the cash collected. The strike and negative publicity led to changes being made to limit the health effects of the inhalation of white phosphorus.

Attempts were made to reduce the ill-effects on workers through the introduction of inspections and regulations. Anton Schrötter von Kristelli discovered in 1850 that heating white phosphorus at 250 °C in an inert atmosphere produced a red allotropic form, which did not fume in contact with air. It was suggested that this would make a suitable substitute in match manufacture although it was slightly more expensive. Two French chemists, Henri Savene and Emile David Cahen, proved in 1898 that the addition of phosphorus sesquisulfide meant that the substance was not poisonous, that it could be used in a "strike-anywhere" match, and that the match heads were not explosive.

British company Albright and Wilson was the first company to produce phosphorus sesquisulfide matches commercially. The company developed a safe means of making commercial quantities of phosphorus sesquisulfide in 1899 and started selling it to match manufacturers. However, white phosphorus continued to be used, and its serious effects led many countries to ban its use. Finland prohibited the use of white phosphorus in 1872, followed by Denmark in 1874, France in 1897, Switzerland in 1898, and the Netherlands in 1901. An agreement, the Berne Convention, was reached at Bern, Switzerland, in September 1906, which banned the use of white phosphorus in matches. This required each country to pass laws prohibiting the use of white phosphorus in matches. The United Kingdom passed a law in 1908 prohibiting its use in matches after 31 December 1910. The United States did not pass a law, but instead placed a "punitive tax" in 1913 on white phosphorus–based matches, one so high as to render their manufacture financially impractical, and Canada banned them in 1914. India and Japan banned them in 1919; China followed, banning them in 1925.

In 1901 Albright and Wilson started making phosphorus sesquisulfide at their Niagara Falls, New York plant for the US market, but American manufacturers continued to use white phosphorus matches. The Niagara Falls plant made them until 1910, when the United States Congress forbade the shipment of white phosphorus matches in interstate commerce.

Safety matches

The dangers of white phosphorus in the manufacture of matches led to the development of the "hygienic" or "safety match". The major innovation in its development was the use of red phosphorus, not on the head of the match but instead on a specially designed striking surface.

Arthur Albright developed the industrial process for large-scale manufacture of red phosphorus after Schrötter's discoveries became known. By 1851, his company was producing the substance by heating white phosphorus in a sealed pot at a specific temperature. He exhibited his red phosphorus in 1851, at The Great Exhibition held at The Crystal Palace in London.

The idea of creating a specially designed striking surface was developed in 1844 by the Swede Gustaf Erik Pasch. Pasch patented the use of red phosphorus in the striking surface. He found that this could ignite heads that did not need to contain white phosphorus. Johan Edvard Lundström and his younger brother Carl Frans Lundström (1823–1917) started a large-scale match industry in Jönköping, Sweden around 1847, but the improved safety match was not introduced until around 1850–55. The Lundström brothers had obtained a sample of red phosphorus matches from Arthur Albright at The Great Exhibition, but had misplaced it and therefore they did not try the matches until just before the Paris Exhibition of 1855 when they found that the matches were still usable. In 1858 their company produced around 12 million matchboxes.

The safety of true "safety matches" is derived from the separation of the reactive ingredients between a match head on the end of a paraffin-impregnated splint and the special striking surface (in addition to the safety aspect of replacing the white phosphorus with red phosphorus). The idea for separating the chemicals had been introduced in 1859 in the form of two-headed matches known in France as Allumettes Androgynes. These were sticks with one end made of potassium chlorate and the other of red phosphorus. They had to be broken and the heads rubbed together. There was however a risk of the heads rubbing each other accidentally in their box. Such dangers were removed when the striking surface was moved to the outside of the box. The development of a specialized matchbook with both matches and a striking surface occurred in the 1890s with the American Joshua Pusey, who sold his patent to the Diamond Match Company.

The striking surface on modern matchboxes is typically composed of 25% powdered glass or other abrasive material, 50% red phosphorus, 5% neutralizer, 4% carbon black, and 16% binder; and the match head is typically composed of 45–55% potassium chlorate, with a little sulfur and starch, a neutralizer (ZnO or ), 20–40% of siliceous filler, diatomite, and glue. Safety matches ignite due to the extreme reactivity of phosphorus with the potassium chlorate in the match head. When the match is struck the phosphorus and chlorate mix in a small amount forming something akin to the explosive Armstrong's mixture which ignites due to the friction.

The Swedes long held a virtual worldwide monopoly on safety matches, with the industry mainly situated in Jönköping, by 1903 called Jönköpings & Vulcans Tändsticksfabriks AB. In France, they sold the rights to their safety match patent to Coigent Père & Fils of Lyon, but Coigent contested the payment in the French courts, on the basis that the invention was known in Vienna before the Lundström brothers patented it. The British match manufacturer Bryant and May visited Jönköping in 1858 to try to obtain a supply of safety matches, but it was unsuccessful. In 1862 it established its own factory and bought the rights for the British safety match patent from the Lundström brothers.

Varieties of matches today

Friction matches made with white phosphorus as well as those made from phosphorus sesquisulfide can be struck on any suitable surface. They have remained particularly popular in the United States, even when safety matches had become common in Europe, and are still widely used today around the world, including in many developing countries, for such uses as camping, outdoor activities, emergency/survival situations, and stocking homemade survival kits. However, strike-anywhere matches are banned on all kinds of aircraft under the "dangerous goods" classification U.N. 1331, Matches, strike-anywhere.

Safety matches are classified as dangerous goods, "U.N. 1944, Matches, safety". They are not universally forbidden on aircraft; however, they must be declared as dangerous goods and individual airlines or countries may impose tighter restrictions.

Storm matches, also known as lifeboat matches or flare matches, are often included in survival kits. They have a strikeable tip similar to a normal match, but the combustible compound – including an oxidiser – continues down the length of the stick, coating half or more of the entire matchstick. The match also has a waterproof coating (which often makes the match more difficult to light), and often storm matches are longer than standard matches. As a result of the combustible coating, storm matches burn strongly even in strong winds, and can even spontaneously re-ignite after being briefly immersed in water. The pyrotechnics compound burns self-sustained.

The hobby of collecting match-related items, such as matchcovers and matchbox labels, is known as phillumeny.

See also 

 Firelighting
 Ivar Kreuger
 Lighter
 London matchgirls strike of 1888
 Permanent match
 Swedish Match
"The Little Match Girl", a fairy tale
 The Safety Matches, a 1969 novel
 Vesta case
 White phosphorus munitions

References

Bibliography 
 Threlfall, Richard E. (1951). The Story of 100 Years of Phosphorus Making: 1851–1951. Oldbury: Albright & Wilson Ltd.

Further reading 
 Beaver, Patrick (1985). The Match Makers: The Story of Bryant & May. London: Henry Melland Limited. ISBN 0-907929-11-7
 Emsley, John (2000). The Shocking History of Phosphorus: A Biography of the Devil's Element. Basingstoke: Macmillan Publishing. ISBN 0-333-76638-5
 Steele, H. Thomas (1987). Close Cover Before Striking: The Golden Age of Matchbook Art. Abeville Press

External links

"Making 125,000 Matches An Hour", August 1946, Popular Science article on the modern mass production of wooden stem matches

library.thinkquest.org/23062/match.htm
"Lighting a Match", Royal Institution video on the ignition process
Chemistry of Matches, Graphics and Video

 
Camping equipment
Chinese inventions
English inventions
Firelighting
German inventions
Hungarian inventions
Scottish inventions